Nives Zeljković (born 18 December 1981), known by her stage name Nives Celzijus or Nives Celsius, is a Croatian model, singer and writer.

Personal and media life 
Nives was born in Zagreb, at the time part of Yugoslavia. Her biological, estranged, father Spaso Čanković (known as Anej Sam) was born in Sanski Most, Bosnia and Herzegovina and works as a writer in Slovenia. Her mother is named Mira. She is an ethnic Serb. Her parents separated prior to her birth. During the Croatian War of Independence, she was abused due to her surname. She has stated that she was raped at the age of 16 by a Dinamo Zagreb player, though she did no go on to reveal his name. She lived in Belgrade for a couple of years before returning to Zagreb, where she released the song "Na koljena" (On Your Knees) which became a hit.

Zeljković was married to Croatian football player Dino Drpić, with whom she has two children, Leone and Taiša. The couple has been named "David and Victoria Beckham of Baden" in Germany. As a guest of Serbian RTV Pink show Ami G Show on 22 January 2009, Zeljković stated she and her husband had sex in an empty Stadion Maksimir, a statement which attracted a lot of media attention. In October 2009 she was sentenced by the Municipal Criminal Court for defamation, after she stated in an interview for Serbian Playboy magazine that her father molested her.

In 2008, Zeljković and husband Dino made headlines across Europe in a bizarre story. While vacationing on the Croatian island of Krk, their son Leone was mistakenly identified as the abducted English girl Madeleine McCann, who was last seen in Portugal.

In 2014, Zeljković amicably divorced her husband.

In 2014, Zeljković was one of the judges in the eleventh episode of the first season of Tvoje lice zvuči poznato, the Croatian version of the show Your Face Sounds Familiar. On January 27, 2017 it was revealed that Nives would compete in the fourth season of the show. She won only one of the 12 episodes, imitating Ylvis with the song "The Fox (What Does the Fox Say?)", but she still got enough points to qualify to the final round achieving the second highest number of points. In the final, she imitated Anthony Kiedis of the Red Hot Chili Peppers with the smash hit song "Dani California", which lead her to the victory. She was the first female winner of the show. As a contestant, she was a public favourite, with performances imitating Keith Flint of The Prodigy, Severina, Zvonko Bogdan, Sylvester Stallone from the 1976 film Rocky, and many more. She was the judge for the fifth season, alongside the previous winners, as well as the sixth season.

Sexiest women countdowns

Discography 
 Cura moderna (1999)

Bibliography 
 2008 – Gola istina (The Naked Truth)
 2009 – U krevetu sa C.R. (In Bed with C.R.)
 2011 – Oreal (Halo)
 2014 – Gola istina 2 (The Naked Truth 2)

Filmography

Awards and nominations

References 

1981 births
Living people
Models from Zagreb
Croatian female models
21st-century Croatian women singers
Croatian pop singers
Croatian folk-pop singers
Croatian women writers
Association footballers' wives and girlfriends
Serbs of Croatia
Croatian mezzo-sopranos
Bild people
Musicians from Zagreb
Your Face Sounds Familiar winners